Dr Salah Al Bander (also Al Bandar, born 1955) is a British citizen of Sudanese origin known for his role in revealing the Bandargate scandal in Bahrain. Al Bander had been working as a strategic planning adviser to the Royal Court of Bahrain since January 2002, then he was seconded to Ministry of Cabinet Affairs in January 2006. On 13 September 2006 he was arrested and deported to London by Bahraini security officials  after he distributed a report revealing a conspiracy to suppress the Shia in Bahrain (who form the majority of the population). The scandal that ensued was named Bandargate, after him. Al Bander is also the Secretary General of the MOWATIN: Gulf Centre for Democratic Development, a London-registered non-governmental organisation.

UK politics
He served as a city councillor in Cambridge for the Liberal Democrats from 2008-2012.  He left the Liberal Democrats in 2015.

See also
 Bandargate scandal
 Politics of Bahrain
 Whistleblower

References

 300 protesters in Bahrain demand investigation into alleged conspiracy to rig elections, International Herald Tribune, 17 November 2006
 Al-Bandar Ejection Exposes Bahrain Split, Washington Post, 2 October 2006
 Allegations of treason, vote-rigging warn of sectarian strife ahead of Bahrain elections, International Herald Tribune, 2 OCtober 2006
 Al Bander-Gate: A Political Scandal In Bahrain, Bahrain Center for Human Rights, September 2006
 Documents related to Bandargate, Bahrain Center for Human Rights
 BandarGate, Lord Eric Avebury, 5 October 2006
 Banning Publication of News or Information Related to the “Bandar-Gate” Scandal, Bahrain Center for Human Rights, 6 October 2006
 “Bandar-Gate” and the Dangerous Role Played by Some Human Rights Societies and its Relation to the secret organization, Statement by Bahraini Human Rights Activists, 10 October 2006
 Activists and journalist receive threats for highlighting Bandargate scandal, Bahrain Center for Human Rights, 12 October 2006
 Bahrain: Must be election season, Toby Jones, 12 October 2006
 Concern over the lack of an official response to Al Bandergate, Bahrain Center for Human Rights, 13 October 2006
 Petition From A Hundred Prominent Figures And Activists To The King Of Bahrain regarding Bandargate scandal, 13 October 2006
 Documentary video: Political Naturalization in Bahrain
 Mahmood's Den Bandargate Archive
 Bandargate Blog
 BANDARGATE!, Gulf Daily News, 24 September 2006
 BANDARGATE: The unanswered questions, Gulf Daily News, 27 September 2006
 Probe Call, Gulf Daily News, 27 September 2006
 MPs call for Al Bandar probe, Gulf Daily News, 27 September 2006
 Secret offer to run society is alleged, Gulf Daily News, 29 September 2006
 Activists charting action plan, Gulf Daily News, 29 September 2006
 High Court issues Bandar Press gag, Gulf Daily News, 5 October 2006
 Societies call to lift Press gag, Gulf Daily News, 9 October 2006
 Video: Press conference of Dr Salah Al Bandar the UK House of Lords (Parts: 1, 2, 3)
 Video: Discussion with Dr Salah Al Bandar on Kawthar TV (Parts: 1, 2, 3)

Politics of Bahrain
British whistleblowers
British Sunni Muslims
English people of Sudanese descent
Living people
1950s births
People deported from Bahrain